Daniel Sleigh is a South African novelist who writes in Afrikaans. He was born on the farm Geelbeksfontein on the West Coast on 3 November 1938. He matriculated at Vredenburg High School and then joined the South African Navy. Until 1962, he studied at the Paarl Training College to become a Physical Education teacher, after which he taught in Namibia and Cape Town.

In 1969 he completed his BA Degree in History and English Literature at the University of South Africa (UNISA). Sleigh then completed a MA Degree cum laude, followed by a Doctorate in History in 1987 at the University of Stellenbosch. Until his retirement in 1996, Sleigh worked at the Western Cape Department of Education.

He made his literary debut in 1974 with the volume of poetry entitled Duif oor water. This was followed by historical works for young people, like Die buiteposte and Tussen twee vlae.

In 2001 he won the Sanlam/Insig/Tafelberg Competition for his novel Eilande. This novel was later also awarded the WA Hofmeyr, RAU, M-Net and Helgaard Steyn Prizes.

Awards 

 C Louis Leipoldt Prize (1971) – Duif oor water
 Winner of the Sanlam/Insig/Kwela Great Novel Competition (2001) – Eilande
 W.A. Hofmeyr Prize (2003) – Eilande
 RAU Prize for Creative Writing (2003) – Eilande
 M-Net Prize for Creative Writing in Afrikaans (2004) – Eilande
 Helgaard Steyn Prize (2004) – Eilande
 Medal from the Academy for Science and Culture (2007)
 K. Sello Duiker Memorial Literary Award for Afstande (2011)
University of Johannesburg Prize for Wals met Maltilda (2012)
SALA Novel Award for 1795 (2018)

List of published works 

Poetry
1971 Duif oor water, Tafelberg

Prose: novels
1972 Die nege-maande-mars, Tafelberg
1973 ’n Man om te hardloop, Tafelberg
1977 Sersant Barodien, Kaapse Korps, Tafelberg
1978 ’n Kanon vir Barbier, Tafelberg
1979 Vryburger Tas, Tafelberg
2002 Eilande, Tafelberg
2010 Afstande, Tafelberg
2011 Wals met Matilda, Tafelberg

Prose: youth novels
1974 Tussen twee vlae, Tafelberg 
1975 Onder die bittervaan, Tafelberg
1976 Anselm en die jut, Van der Walt

Non-fiction
1978 Jan Kompanjie: die wêreld van die Verenigde Oos-Indiese Kompanjie, Tafelberg
1979 Ruiters teen die Ryk, Nasou
1988 The Huguenots (with AJ Grant and Ronald Mayo), Maskew Miller Longman
1993 Die buiteposte, HAUM
1996 The Forts of the Liesbeeck Frontier, Castle Military Museum
1999 The Ride Against an Empire, Castle Military Museum

Translations

Eilande (2002) into English (Islands, 2004) and Dutch (Stemmen uit zee, 2004)
Afstande (2010) into Dutch (De lange tocht, 2011)

References

External links 
 Dan Sleigh's biography on publisher's website

Living people
1938 births
Afrikaner people
Afrikaans-language writers
Afrikaans literature
South African male novelists
Historians of the Dutch East India Company